Scoturopsis is a genus of moths of the family Notodontidae. It consists of the following species:
Scoturopsis basilinea  Hering, 1925
Scoturopsis coras  (Druce, 1893) 
Scoturopsis flaviplaga  (Dognin, 1911) 
Scoturopsis franclemonti  Miller, 2008
Scoturopsis seitzi  Hering, 1925
Scoturopsis unifascia  (Hering, 1925) 

Notodontidae of South America